These are the results for the girls' singles event at the 2014 Summer Youth Olympics.

Xu Shilin of China won the gold medal, defeating Iryna Shymanovich of Belarus in the final, 6–3, 6–1.

Akvilė Paražinskaitė of Lithuania won the bronze medal, defeating Anhelina Kalinina of Ukraine in the bronze medal match, 6–3, 7–5.

Seeds

Main draw

Finals

Top half

Bottom half

References 
 Main draw

Girl's singles